Zahra (Arabic: زهراء) is a female given name of Arabic origin. It means ‘beautiful, bright, shining and brilliant’. The name became popularized as a result of being the name of Muhammad’s daughter, Fatimah al-Zahra.

The Ottoman empire expanded the use of this name to countries like Albania, Kosovo and Bosnia and the name was also popularized by the Persian empire's influence in the Indian subcontinent, respectively. Zahra is also used as a surname, particularly in Malta.

The names are difficult to distinguish transliteration, and may be transliterated in various ways, such as Zehra, Zahra(h),  Zara, and Zohrah.

Female given name

Sahra
Sahra Hausmann (born 1973), Norwegian team handball player
Sahra Wagenknecht (born 1969), German politician (with Iranian father)

Zahra
Zahra Abdulla (born 1966), Somali-Finnish politician
Zahra Abrahimzadeh, mother of Arman Abrahimzadeh, murdered by her husband
Zahra Foundation, named after her
Zahra Ahmadi (born 1983), British actress
Zahra Airall, women's rights activist
Khalub Zahra, was the mother of the 10th-century caliph of Baghdad al-Muttaqi (r. 940–944).
Zahra Amir Ebrahimi (born 1981), Iranian television actress
Zahra Bahrami (c. 1965–2011), Dutch/Iranian executed for drug trafficking
Zahra Bani (born 1979), Somali-Italian javelin thrower
Zahra Bani Yaghoub (1980–2007), an Iranian doctor who died in prison
Zohra Bensalem (born 1990), Algerian volleyball player
Zahra Dowlatabadi (born 1962), Iranian filmmaker
Zahra Eshraghi (born c. 1964), Iranian feminist and human rights activist
Zahra Freeth (born c. 1930), a British writer on Middle Eastern subjects
Zahra Jishi, Lebanese-American translator of Arabic literature
Zahra Kamalfar, Iranian refugee to Canada
Zahra Kazemi (1949–2003), Iranian-Canadian freelance photographer
Zahra Aga Khan (born 1970), Swiss-born princess
Zahra Khanom Tadj es-Saltaneh (1883–1936), a Persian princess
Zahra' Langhi, Libyan gender specialist, civil society strategist and political activist
Zahra Lari, Emirati figure skater
Zahra Mansouri, Moroccan poet
Zahra Mostafavi Khomeini (born c. 1940), Iranian politician, daughter of Ayatollah Khomeini
Zahra Rahmat Allah (born 1954), Yemeni short story writer
Zahra Rahnavard (born 1945), Iranian artist and politician
Zahra Ouaziz (born 1969), Moroccan long-distance runner
Zahra Redwood, Jamaican beauty queen
Zahra Schreiber, a wrestler in NXT who was fired after posting Nazi images
Zahra Shojaei, Iranian politician
Zahra Universe, American musician and actress

Zehra

Given name
Zehra Bilir (1913–2007), Turkish folk singer
Zehra Borazancı (born 1989), Turkish Cypriot women's footballer
Zehra Çırak (born 1960), Turkish-German writer
Zehra Deović (1938–2015), Bosnian sevdalinka singer
Zehra Fazal (born 1986), South Asian-American voice actresses 
Zehra Güneş (born 1999), Turkish volleyball player
Zehra Khan (born 1983), American artist
Zehra Nigah, Pakistani Urdu poet
Zehra Öktem (born 1959), Turkish archer
Zehra Say (1906–1990), Turkish painter
Zehra Sayers (born 1953), Turkish scientist in structural biology
Zehra Zümrüt Selçuk (born 1979), Turkish politician
Zehra Topel (born 1987), Turkish international chess master

Middle name
Belkıs Zehra Kaya (born 1984), Turkish judoka

Zohra
Zohra Begum Kazi (1912–2007), Bangladeshi physician
Zohra Daoud (born 1954), Afghan actress and model
Zohra Drif (born 1934), lawyer and member of the Algerian senate
Zohra Lampert (born 1937), American character actress
Zohra Sehgal (1912–2014), Indian actress
Zohra Sarwari, Afghan-American author

Zohre
Zohre Esmaeli (born 1985), Afghan model, designer and author

Zuhra
Zuhra Ramdan Agha Al-Awji (active 1920s), Turkish-Libyan educator

Part of the female given name Fatimah Zahra

This has then been used as a female given name as follows.
Fatima Al Zahraa Haider (born ca. 1910), an Egyptian princess
Lalla Fatima Zohra (born 1929), Moroccan princess
Fatima-Zohra Imalayen, known as Assia Djebar (born 1936), Algerian novelist, translator and filmmaker
Fatima Zohra Karadja (born 1949), Algerian, Vice-President for the African Union's Economic, Social and Cultural Council for Northern Africa
Fatma-Zohra Oukazi (born 1984), Algerian volleyball player
Fatima Zohra Cherif (born 1986), Algerian volleyball player
Fatima Zahra Djouad (born 1988), Algerian volleyball player

Male given name
Zuhrah ibn Kilab, great-great-granduncle of Muhammad.

Surname
Adrian Zahra (born 1990), Australian footballer (of Maltese descent)
Antoine Zahra (disambiguation), several people
Brian K. Zahra (born ca. 1960), American judge
Christian Zahra (born 1973), Maltese-Australian politician
Francesco Zahra (1710–1773), Maltese painter
Hindi Zahra (born 1979), Moroccan pop singer
Julie Zahra (born 1982), Maltese singer
Muhammad Abu Zahra (1898–1974), Egyptian scholar of Islamic law and author
Scott Zahra, Australian rugby league player
Trevor Żahra (born 1947), Maltese novelist, poet and illustrator

See also
Abdul Zahra, Arabic male name
Sarah (given name), female given name
Zara (given name), female given name
Zerah, male given name occurring in the Hebrew Bible
Zuhra (الزُهرة), the Arabic word for Venus

References

Arabic feminine given names
Bosnian feminine given names
Pakistani feminine given names